Lepidothamnus is a genus of conifers belonging to the podocarp family Podocarpaceae. The genus includes three species of dioecious or monoecious evergreen trees and shrubs, and creepers. L. intermedius and L. laxifolius are native to New Zealand. L. fonkii is native to the Magellanic subpolar forests ecoregion of southern Argentina and Chile, where it grows as a low shrub or creeper in moorlands and bogs.

External links
 Pictures of Lepidothamnus fonckii in Chile.

Podocarpaceae
Podocarpaceae genera